Billy McGovern Stacy (July 30, 1936 – September 10, 2019) was an American professional football player who played five seasons in the National Football League (NFL) for the Chicago/St. Louis Cardinals. He was selected to one Pro Bowl. He later served as mayor of Starkville, Mississippi (1985–1989).

He was the last player in NFL history to record a touchdown reception, a fumble return touchdown, and an interception return touchdown in a single season until J. J. Watt did so in 2014.

See also
 List of NCAA major college yearly punt and kickoff return leaders

References

1936 births
2019 deaths
People from Drew, Mississippi
People from Starkville, Mississippi
Players of American football from Mississippi
American football defensive backs
American football quarterbacks
Mississippi State Bulldogs football players
Chicago Cardinals players
St. Louis Cardinals (football) players
Eastern Conference Pro Bowl players
Mayors of places in Mississippi
American athlete-politicians